The 1946 Iowa gubernatorial election was held on November 5, 1946. Incumbent Republican Robert D. Blue defeated Democratic nominee Frank Miles with 57.40% of the vote.

Primary elections
Primary elections were held on June 3, 1946.

Democratic primary

Candidates
Frank Miles, Editor of the Iowa Legionnaire

Results

Republican primary

Candidates
Robert D. Blue, incumbent Governor
George H. Olmsted, United States Army General

Results

General election

Candidates
Major party candidates
Robert D. Blue, Republican
Frank Miles, Democratic 

Other candidates
E. P. Gabriel, Prohibition

Results

References

1946
Iowa